Dumbbells is a 2014 comedy film directed by Christopher Livingston and starring Brian Drolet, Hoyt Richards, Mircea Monroe, Jaleel White, Taylor Cole, Jay Mohr, Tom Arnold, Laura Ashley Samuels and Andy Milonakis, with a rare film appearance by Nancy Olson (her first film in 17 years). The film saw a limited release on January 10, 2014. The film also marks the film debut of singer Frenchie Davis. The film received generally negative reviews from critics.

Synopsis
Chris Long is an ex-NCAA basketball player turned trainer who finds a new purpose when his gym's new owner, Jack, unleashes a lucrative plan to turn the neglected business into a reality show. When Chris' co-workers resist this new direction, he and Jack form an unlikely alliance that allows them to face the demons of their pasts and ultimately, save the gym's future.

Cast
 Brian Drolet as Chris Long
 Hoyt Richards as Jack Guy
 Jaleel White as The Leader
 Mircea Monroe as Kim Hertz 
 Taylor Cole as Rachel Corelli
 Frenchie Davis as Venus
 Carl Reiner as Donald Cummings
 Nancy Olson as Bianca Cummings
 Jay Mohr as Harold
 Olivia Taylor Dudley as Heather
 Michael Ray Bower as Erwin
 Laura Ashley Samuels as Candy
 Valery M. Ortiz as Missy
 Andy Milonakis as Rusty
 Tom Arnold as Daddy
 Fabio Lanzoni as himself
 Jason Scott Jenkins as Dre Lincoln

Reception
Rotten Tomatoes gave the film a score of 14% based on 7 reviews, with an average score of 2.52/10. On Metacritic, the film has a score of 24 out of 100 based on 6 critics, indicating "generally unfavorable reviews".

Dumbbells attracted media attention in France in January 2016, when Netflix released a dubbed version of  very low quality. The French version, which had been recorded in South Africa by non-professional actors, was called "the worst dubbing in history".  Netflix reacted to the negative reception by removing the film from its French platform and ordering a redub by Titrafilm studio.

References

External links
 
 
 

2014 films
2014 comedy films
American comedy films
2010s English-language films
2010s American films